Mohammed Tahir Mustafa Tahir al-Husayni (alternatively transliterated al-Husseini) (1842–1908) was the Qadi (Chief Justice) of the Sharia courts of Jerusalem and was the father of Kamil al-Husayni and Mohammad Amin al-Husayni, both of whom held the equivalent position in the British mandated period of Grand Mufti of Jerusalem.

Born in Jerusalem to the al-Husayni family, Tahir was appointed the Qadi of Jerusalem in the 1860s by officials in the Ottoman Empire. From 1865 until his death, he held the post of Mufti of Jerusalem. Tahir sat on the committee of A'ayan scrutinising land sales to foreigners in the Jerusalem area, this in effect stopped land sales to Jews for a few years, beginning in 1897. When he died, his son Kamil became the Mufti of Jerusalem and later (1918) the Grand Mufti.

Mohammed Tahir al-Husayni was one of the earliest critics of Zionism, in the 1880s and 1890s, and he tried several times to prevent Jewish immigrants from purchasing lands in the Mutasarrifiyya of Jerusalem.
In 1897, a commission headed by the Mufti managed to halt Jewish immigration for the next few years. When the Administrative Council received a report about Jewish immigration in September 1899, Mufti Husayni "proposed that the new arrivals be terrorised prior to the expulsion of all foreign Jews established in Palestine since 1891."  But his extreme proposal was turned down by the Mutasarrif in favor of a policy which allowed Jewish immigration as long as the immigrants assimilated as Ottoman citizens.

References

External links
Palestinian Personalities: Al-Hussaini, Mohammed Tahir

Further reading

Zvi Elpeleg (1992, David Harvey, trans.). The Grand Mufti : Haj Amin al-Hussaini, Founder of the Palestinian National Movement (London: Frank Cass) 

1842 births
1908 deaths
Grand Muftis of Jerusalem
Palestinian Sunni Muslims
20th-century imams
Mohammed Tahir
19th-century Arabs